Fazl is an Arabic word meaning grace or virtue. It may also be transliterated as Fadl, or with the addition of an extra vowel. It is used as a given name, and also as a constituent of several compound names.  Examples are:

Constituent of compound names
Al-Fadl - the bounty
Abu'l-Fadl - father of virtue
Fazlallah - bounty of Allah
Fazlul Haq - bounty of the Truth
Fazlul Karim - bounty of the Generous One
Fazl ur Rahman - bounty of the Merciful One

Used as free-standing name
Fazal, with list of names using that transliteration
Fadel, with list of names using that or similar transliteration

References

Arabic masculine given names